Peter Frederick Simpson (born 13 January 1945) is an English former footballer who played most of his career as a defender with Arsenal.

Career
Born in Gorleston-on-Sea, Norfolk, Simpson initially joined Arsenal as a member of the club's groundstaff in 1960, before signing as an apprentice a year later in October 1961. He turned professional seven months later, in May 1962. He played for Arsenal's youth and reserve teams at first, before making his first team debut against Chelsea, in a First Division match on 14 March 1964; Arsenal lost 4–2.

He was not immediately a regular in the Arsenal side, making just 22 appearances over the course of three seasons. However, with the appointment of Bertie Mee before the start of the 1966–67 season, Simpson was promoted to a first-team place, and became a mainstay of the Arsenal side for the best part of a decade. He started out as a utility man playing in every outfield position, but by the time he was a regular he had settled into the centre half position, usually alongside Frank McLintock.

Simpson was a leading figure in Arsenal's brief period of success in the early 1970s. After losing both the 1968 and 1969 League Cup finals, Simpson was a key part of the side that won the Inter-Cities Fairs Cup in 1969–70, making a total of 57 appearances in all competitions that season. Simpson went on to be part of the side that won the League Championship and FA Cup Double in 1970–71; though he missed the first three months of that season with a cartilage problem, he returned in time for the FA Cup run, and appeared in the final, a 2–1 victory over Liverpool after extra time.

Despite his long career at the top, he was never capped for England, although he was called into a few squads by Sir Alf Ramsey during 1969–70. He continued to play for the club in the trophyless years following the Double, playing more than 35 games a season for four seasons. However, by 1975 age was starting to get the better of him, and he only played nine times in 1975–76. He earned a recall in 1976–77, appearing in 25 games, but was dropped the following season. He left Arsenal in 1978, having played 477 times for the club, having scored 15 goals; as of 2006 he is tenth in the Arsenal all-time appearances list.

He had brief stints with the New England Tea Men of the NASL in the US, and then returned to England to play for non-league Hendon, before retiring. For the remainder of the 1968 summer season he played in the National Soccer League with Toronto Hellas.

Honours

Individual 

 Arsenal Player of the Season: 1968−69

Sources

References

 Peter Simpson NASL

People from Gorleston-on-Sea
1945 births
Living people
English footballers
Association football central defenders
Arsenal F.C. players
Gorleston F.C. players
Hendon F.C. players
National Professional Soccer League (1967) players
North American Soccer League (1968–1984) players
North American Soccer League (1968–1984) indoor players
Boston Beacons players
New England Tea Men players
Expatriate soccer players in Canada
English expatriate sportspeople in Canada
English expatriate sportspeople in the United States
Expatriate soccer players in the United States
English expatriate footballers
FA Cup Final players
Canadian National Soccer League players